Arthur Sturgis Hardy,   (December 14, 1837 – June 13, 1901) was a Canadian lawyer and Liberal politician who served as the fourth premier of Ontario from 1896 to 1899.

Early life

Born in Mount Pleasant, Brant County, in 1837, Hardy was the son of Russell and Juletta (Sturgis) Hardy, United Empire Loyalists. He studied at the Rockwood Academy in Rockwood, Ontario, and he became town solicitor for Brantford in 1867, a bencher of the Law Society of Upper Canada in 1875, and a QC in 1876. On January 19, 1870, he married Mary Morrison, daughter of Judge Joseph Curran Morrison.

Political career

First elected to the Legislative Assembly of Ontario in 1873, he was promoted to the Cabinet of Sir Oliver Mowat in 1877 as Provincial Secretary. In 1889, as Commissioner of Crown Lands, Hardy established the Algonquin and Rondeau provincial parks. Well known for his support of Mowat's liberalism, he was described in Grip as a hard-nosed and down-to-earth politician in Mowat's service:

Entering his sixties and having been in government for over twenty years, Hardy lacked the energy and strength to take the government forward or excite the populace when he succeeded Mowat as both Premier and Attorney-General in 1896. Initially reluctant to accept the positions, he said:

Aware of his weakness, he relied heavily on his minister of education, George William Ross.

Because there were Liberal governments in both Ottawa and Ontario, Hardy was urged to reassure French-speaking Catholics' concerns over the Manitoba Schools Question by appointing François-Eugène-Alfred Évanturel as Speaker of the Legislative Assembly. In the 1898 election, Hardy's government was returned with a narrow six seat majority due to the collapse of the agrarian Patrons of Industry party which had served as the Liberal's allies in the legislature, as well as the rise of Catholic and urban support for the Conservatives under James Pliny Whitney.

Hardy's most significant—and controversial—achievement occurred in 1898 with passage of an Act providing for all pine cut under licence on crown lands to be sawn into lumber in Canada. Michigan lumbermen sought to have the amendment disallowed for encroaching on the federal trade and commerce power, but Wilfrid Laurier's government refused to do so.

Exhausted and needing money, Hardy retired from politics in 1899 and died two years later from appendicitis. Hardy's body was originally interred at Greenwood Cemetery, however 34 years after his death, his son Senator Arthur Charles Hardy had the remains of Hardy, his wife, and their daughter Gladys Mary Starr moved to Farringdon Burial Ground.

Legacy

An Ontario Historical Plaque was erected in Brantford, Ontario, by the province to commemorate Hardy's role in Ontario's history. On June 25, 2009, a new plaque was unveiled to commemorate Hardy under the initiative of Premiers' Gravesites Program. Local politicians, guests and family members paid tribute to the former politician. The family included his great-great-great-granddaughter and the children of his great-nephew Hagood Hardy.

References

Further reading

External links 
 
 
 Arthur Sturgis Hardy fonds, Archives of Ontario

1837 births
1901 deaths
Premiers of Ontario
Lawyers in Ontario
Canadian King's Counsel
Canadian Anglicans
Leaders of the Ontario Liberal Party
Attorneys General of Ontario
Provincial Secretaries of Ontario
Persons of National Historic Significance (Canada)